"Whistle While You Twurk" is a song by American hip hop group Ying Yang Twins. It was released on March 12, 2000 as the lead single from their debut studio album Thug Walkin' (2000). Produced by Mr. Collipark, the song contains an interpolation of the song "Whistle While You Work" from the 1937 film Snow White and the Seven Dwarfs. There are two remixes of the song: the "ColliPark Remix", and the "E.A. Mix", which features DJ Kizzy Rock and Mr. Ball.

The song was a hit in the early 2000's and was played on urban and pop radio stations. Most notably, it also popularized the dance of twerking.

Charts

References

2000 singles
2000 songs
Ying Yang Twins songs
Songs written by Mr. Collipark